Terence Patrick Drainey (born 1 August 1949, in Manchester) is an English Catholic prelate. He is the seventh and current Bishop of Middlesbrough.

Career
Drainey studied for the priesthood at St Cuthbert's College, Ushaw and the Royal English College at Valladolid, Spain. He was ordained in 1975 for the Diocese of Salford where he worked for ten years as an assistant priest at St Wulstan, Great Harwood. From 1986 to 1991 he was on loan to the Archdiocese of Kisumu in Kenya as a fidei donum (literally translated as "gift of faith") priest.

In 1991, upon leaving Africa, Drainey returned to the Salford diocese where he was appointed parish priest at the church of the Holy Cross, Patricroft, Eccles in Salford, where he served for the next six years prior to being appointed spiritual director to the Royal English College at Valladolid in 1997.

In June 2003, Drainey returned to England to take up the position of President of Ushaw College. Three years later, on 12 April 2006, he was appointed a Papal Chaplain by Pope Benedict XVI with the title of Monsignor.

Drainey was appointed seventh Bishop of Middlesbrough by the Pope on 17 November 2007 and was installed by Patrick Kelly, Archbishop of Liverpool, in St Mary's Cathedral, Middlesbrough, on 25 January 2008. Upon his appointment he requested that people call him "Bishop Terry" to avoid confusion with Bishop Terence Brain of Salford.

References

External links
 Roman Catholic Diocese of Middlesbrough website

1949 births
Living people
Roman Catholic bishops of Middlesbrough
21st-century Roman Catholic bishops in England
Alumni of Ushaw College
English College, Valladolid alumni
Clergy from Manchester
English Roman Catholic bishops